De Bunker is a high security courtroom in Amsterdam Nieuw-West.

Notable trials
Amsterdam sex crimes case - Roberts Mikelson was convicted of abusing 67 children.
Willem Holleeder - convicted of attempted murders and murders, including that of Cor van Hout.
Ricardo Riquelme Vega - convicted of running an assassination ring and laundering illicit drug money.
Ridouan Taghi - on trial.

References

Buildings and structures in Amsterdam
Law of the Netherlands